The conductor Malcolm Sargent's career as a recording artist began in the days of acoustic recording, shortly before the introduction of the microphone and electrical recording, and continued into the stereo LP era. He recorded prolifically from 1924 until 1967, the year of his death.

Description of Sargent's recordings
Sargent's debut recording was Vaughan Williams's Hugh the Drover, in 1924, for His Master's Voice, with singers from the British National Opera Company, with whom he was then performing the work on tour. Although he recorded for other companies, most of his records were made for HMV over the following four decades.

In the early days of electrical recording, he took part in pioneering live recordings with the Royal Choral Society at the Albert Hall. Subsequently, in the recording studio, Sargent was most in demand to record English music, choral works and concertos. He recorded and worked with many orchestras, but made the most recordings (several dozen major pieces) with the BBC Symphony Orchestra, the London Symphony Orchestra, the Philharmonia Orchestra and the Royal Philharmonic Orchestra. In the recording studio, as in the concert hall, Sargent was known for his choral conducting and was in demand as an accompanist in concertos. A high proportion of the recordings listed below are in these categories.

Sargent's choral work was chiefly with the two choirs of which he was the principal conductor, the Royal Choral Society and the Huddersfield Choral Society. For his recordings with the latter, Sargent usually conducted the Liverpool Philharmonic (from 1957, the Royal Liverpool Philharmonic); the pairing of the choir and orchestra became so familiar that the portmanteau word "Hudderspool" was coined for it. Sargent's choral recordings included two versions of Elgar's The Dream of Gerontius, four of Handel's Messiah, two of Mendelssohn's Elijah, and complete sets of Coleridge-Taylor's Hiawatha's Wedding Feast and The Death of Minnehaha, Delius's Songs of Farewell, Handel's Israel in Egypt, Holst's The Hymn of Jesus, Vaughan Williams's Serenade to Music and Walton's Belshazzar's Feast. Some of these have been reissued on compact disc, including both Gerontius sets, three of the Messiah recordings, one of the Elijahs, and Belshazzar's Feast.

 
As a concerto accompanist, Sargent recorded with, among many others, Fritz Kreisler, Artur Schnabel, Jascha Heifetz, Albert Sammons, Clifford Curzon, David Oistrakh, Mstislav Rostropovich, Paul Tortelier, and Jacqueline du Pré. His pre-war recordings with Schnabel of the Beethoven piano concertos have been reissued on compact disc. His association with Heifetz spanned the 78 r.p.m., mono LP and stereo LP eras, and many of their recordings are also available in CD transfers.

Throughout his career, Sargent remained devoted to Gilbert and Sullivan and made 21 recordings of their operas in four different decades. His earliest and last recordings of these works were with the D'Oyly Carte Opera Company for HMV in the 1920s and 30s and for Decca in the 1960s. In the 1950s and early 60s he conducted a series of Gilbert and Sullivan recordings for HMV, casting singers from opera and oratorio, rather than the D'Oyly Carte. All of his Gilbert and Sullivan recordings have been re-released on compact disc, and most remain in the catalogues.

Sources and abbreviations
The sources for this discography are primarily The Gramophone, 1924 onwards; the discography published in Sir Malcolm Sargent: a tribute. (1967). London: Daily Mirror Newspapers, and A Gilbert and Sullivan Discography.

The following abbreviations are used in this list.
BBCSO – BBC Symphony Orchestra
LPO – London Philharmonic Orchestra
LSO – London Symphony Orchestra
RPO – Royal Philharmonic Orchestra
VPO – Vienna Philharmonic Orchestra

Discography
Arne
Rule, Britannia! (arr Sargent): Royal Choral Society, Philharmonia, HMV 1953
Auber 
Zanetta Overture: Orchestra of the Royal Opera House, Covent Garden, HMV, 1931
Bach
Double Violin Concerto: Jascha Heifetz, Erick Friedman, New Symphony Orchestra, RCA, 1962
 H. Balfour Gardiner
Shepherd Fennel's Dance: Royal Liverpool Philharmonic, Columbia, 1947
Bartók
Violin Concerto: Max Rostal, LSO, Decca, 1951
Bax
Coronation March: LSO, Decca, 1953
May-time in Sussex: Harriet Cohen, Orchestra, Columbia, 1947

Beethoven
Piano Concerto No 1: Artur Schnabel, LSO, HMV, 1932
Piano Concerto No 2: Artur Schnabel, LPO, HMV, 1935
Piano Concerto No 3
 Mark Hambourg, LPO, HMV, 1930
 Artur Schnabel, LPO, HMV, 1933
 Benno Moiseiwitsch, Philharmonia, 1952
Piano Concerto No 4: Artur Schnabel, LPO, HMV, 1933
Piano Concerto No 5: Artur Schnabel, LSO, HMV, 1932
Symphony No 3: RPO, HMV, 1961
Triple Concerto: David Oistrakh, Alexander Knushevitzky, Lev Oborin, Philharmonia, Columbia, 1959
(arr Weniger) Moonlight Sonata – first movement; Sonata Pathétique – slow movement: New Light Symphony Orchestra, HMV, 1931
Berlioz 
Béatrice et Bénédict Overture: National Symphony Orchestra, Decca, 1947
Roman Carnival Overture: RPO, HMV, 1961
Bizet 
Carmen – Flower Song: Heddle Nash, Liverpool Philharmonic, HMV, 1945
L'Arlésienne Suite
 Hallé, Columbia, 1942
 Philharmonia, Columbia, 1949
Patrie: New Symphony Orchestra, HMV, 1932
Bliss
Piano Concerto: Trevor Barnard, Philharmonia, HMV, 1962
 Boccherini 
Minuet (arr from Quintet in E, Op 11/5): New Symphony Orchestra, HMV, 1929
Borodin
Nocturne for String Orchestra (arr Sargent): Philharmonia, Columbia, 1950
Brahms
Academic Festival Overture: Liverpool Philharmonic, Columbia, 1948
Hungarian Dance No 5: Liverpool Philharmonic, Columbia, 1948
Variations on a Theme by Haydn: Hallé, Columbia, 1943
Britten
Peter Grimes – Four Sea Interludes: LSO, Columbia, 1948
Simple Symphony: RPO, 1962
Variations and Fugue on a Theme by Purcell (The Young Person's Guide to the Orchestra)
 Liverpool Philharmonic, Columbia, 1947
 BBCSO, HMV, 1962
Bruch
Scottish Fantasy: Jascha Heifetz, LSO, RCA 1954
Violin Concerto No 1: Jascha Heifetz, LSO, RCA, 1954
 Chabrier 
Le roi malgré lui – Fête Polonaise: BBCSO, HMV, 1959
Chopin
Piano Concerto No 1: Earl Wild, RPO, Reader's Digest, 1965
Les Sylphides (arr J Ainslie Murray and Felix White): LPO, HMV, 1941
Les Sylphides (arr Sargent): Orchestra of the Royal Opera House, Covent Garden, HMV, 1963
 Cimarosa
Concerto for Oboe and Strings (arr Arthur Benjamin): Léon Goossens, Liverpool Philharmonic, HMV, 1943

 Coleridge-Taylor
Hiawatha's Wedding Feast
 Walter Glynne, Royal Choral Society, orchestra, HMV, 1930
 Richard Lewis, Royal Choral Society, Philharmonia, HMV, 1962
 – Onaway! Awake, Beloved!: Webster Booth, Liverpool Philharmonic, HMV, 1945
The Death of Minnehaha: Elsie Suddaby, Howard Fry, George Baker, Royal Choral Society, Orchestra, HMV, 1931
Delius
A Song Before Sunrise: RPO, HMV, 1965
Cello Concerto: Jacqueline du Pré, RPO, HMV, 1965
On Hearing the First Cuckoo in Spring: Liverpool Philharmonic, Columbia, 1950
Songs of Farewell: Royal Choral Society, RPO, HMV, 1965
Violin Concerto: Albert Sammons, Liverpool Philharmonic, Columbia, 1945
 Dohnányi
Suite for Orchestra
 LSO, Columbia, 1951
 RPO, HMV, 1962
Variations on a Nursery Song
 Cyril Smith, Liverpool Philharmonic, Columbia, 1945
 Cyril Smith, Philharmonia, HMV, 1954
Dvořák
Cello Concerto: Paul Tortelier, Philharmonia, HMV, 1956
Serenade in E major: RPO, HMV, 1966
Slavonic Dances Nos 1 and 3: Orchestra of the Royal Opera House, Covent Garden, HMV, 1933
Slavonic Dance No 10: BBCSO, HMV, 1959
Symphonic Variations: BBCSO, HMV, 1959
The Spectre's Bride – Where art Thou Father dear?: Isobel Baillie, Philharmonia, HMV, 1948
Violin Concerto: Ruggiero Ricci, LSO, Decca, 1961

Elgar
Cello Concerto: Paul Tortelier, BBCSO, HMV, 1954
The Dream of Gerontius
 Heddle Nash, Gladys Ripley, Dennis Noble, Norman Walker, Huddersfield Choral Society, Liverpool Philharmonic, HMV, 1945
 Richard Lewis, Marjorie Thomas, John Cameron, Huddersfield Choral Society, Liverpool Philharmonic, HMV 1955
Enigma Variations
 LSO, Decca, 1953 
 Philharmonia, HMV, 1960
Imperial March: LSO, Decca, 1953
Nursery Suite – The Serious Doll: Liverpool Philharmonic, Columbia, 1943
Pomp and Circumstance March No 1
 LSO, Decca, 1953
 Philharmonia, Columbia, 1949
 BBCSO, HMV, 1959
Pomp and Circumstance March No 4
 Philharmonia, Columbia, 1949
 LSO, Decca, 1953
The Kingdom – The Sun Goeth Down: Isobel Baillie, Philharmonia, Columbia, 1948
Violin Concerto: Jascha Heifetz, LSO, HMV, 1950
The Wand of Youth, Suite No 2
 Liverpool Philharmonic, Columbia, 1950
 BBCSO, HMV, 1953
Falla
The Three-Cornered Hat – Suite: New Light Symphony Orchestra, HMV, 1928
Fauré
Pavane: Chorus, Philharmonia, 1947
German
March Rhapsody: LSO, HMV, 1932
Merrymakers' Dance: New Symphony Orchestra, HMV, 1929
Tom Jones orchestral suite: Orchestra, HMV, 1932
Gluck
Orfeo ed Euridice – What is life?: Kathleen Ferrier, LSO, Decca, 1946
Gounod
Faust – All hail, thou dwelling!: Heddle Nash, Liverpool Philharmonic, HMV, 1945
Grainger
Handel in the Strand: New Light Symphony Orchestra, HMV, 1931
Mock Morris: New Light Symphony Orchestra, HMV, 1931
Grieg
Lyric Suite: National Symphony Orchestra, Decca, 1948

Handel
Acis and Galatea
 – Would you gain: Richard Lewis, LSO, HMV, 1958
 – O Didst Thou Know? As When the Dove: Isobel Baillie, Liverpool Philharmonic, Columbia, 1945
Alexander's Feast
 – Revenge, Timotheous cries: Trevor Anthony, LSO, Decca, 1949
 – War, he sung: Richard Lewis, LSO, HMV, 1958
Israel in Egypt: Elsie Morison, Monica Sinclair, Richard Lewis, Huddersfield Choral Society, Liverpool Philharmonic, Columbia, 1956
Jephtha
 – Deeper, and deeper still … Waft her angels: Webster Booth, Liverpool Philharmonic, HMV, 1945
 – Waft her, angels; For ever blessed: Richard Lewis, LSO, HMV, 1958
Joshua – So long the memory … While Kedron's brook: Richard Lewis, LSO, HMV, 1958
Judas Maccabaeus – Thanks to my brethren … How vain is man; My arms! … Sound an alarm!: Richard Lewis, LSO, HMV, 1958
Messiah
 Isobel Baillie, Gladys Ripley, James Johnston, Norman Walker, Huddersfield Choral Society, Liverpool Philharmonic, Columbia, 1946
 Elsie Morison, Marjorie Thomas, Richard Lewis, Norman Walker, Huddersfield Choral Society, Liverpool Philharmonic, Columbia, 1954
 Elsie Morison, Marjorie Thomas, Richard Lewis, James Milligan, Huddersfield Choral Society, Royal Liverpool Philharmonic, HMV, 1959
Elizabeth Harwood, Norma Procter, Alexander Young, John Shirley-Quirk, Royal Choral Society, RPO, Reader's Digest, 1964
 – And the Glory of the Lord; Glory to God; Behold the Lamb of God; Surely He Hath Borne Our Griefs; All We Like Sheep; Hallelujah!; Amen: Royal Choral Society, Royal Albert Hall Orchestra, HMV, 1926
 – Overture and Pastoral Symphony: LSO, HMV, 1931
 – And the glory of the Lord; Hallelujah!: Royal Choral Society, LPO, HMV, 1932
 – Behold the Lamb of God; Glory to God: Royal Choral Society, LPO, HMV, 1933
 – Rejoice Greatly, O Daughter of Zion!; If God be for us, who can be against us?: Isobel Baillie, Liverpool Philharmonic, Columbia, 1945
 – I know that my Redeemer liveth: Ada Alsop, LSO, Decca, 1949
Overture in D minor (arr Elgar): RPO, HMV, 1959
Rodelinda – Art Thou Troubled?: Kathleen Ferrier, LSO, Decca, 1946 
Royal Fireworks Music (arr Harty): 
 Liverpool Philharmonic, Columbia, 1948
 BBCSO, HMV, 1954
 RPO, HMV, 1959
Samson – Total eclipse: Richard Lewis, LSO, HMV, 1958
Samson Overture: RPO, HMV, 1959
Semele – Where'er you walk 
 Richard Lewis, LSO, Decca, 1949
 Richard Lewis, LSO, HMV, 1958
Serse – "Ombra mai fu": Kathleen Ferrier, LSO, Decca, 1949
Solomon (arr Costa and Sargent) – From the censer curling rise: Huddersfield Choral Society, Royal Liverpool Philharmonic, HMV, 1959
Water Music (arr Harty) 
 Hallé, Columbia, 1942
 BBCSO, HMV, 1954 
 RPO, HMV, 1959
Zadok the Priest (arr Sargent): Huddersfield Choral Society, Royal Liverpool Philharmonic, HMV, 1959
Harty 
A John Field Suite: Liverpool Philharmonic, Columbia, 1943
Haydn
Cello Concerto in D: Emanuel Feuermann, Symphony Orchestra, Columbia, 1936
The Creation – The heavens are telling; Achieved is the glorious work: Royal Choral Society, LPO, HMV, 1933
Symphony No 94: Liverpool Philharmonic, Columbia, 1948
 Hérold
Zampa Overture: Liverpool Philharmonic, Columbia, 1948

Holst
Oriental Suite Beni Mora: BBCSO, HMV, 1958
St Paul's Suite: RPO, HMV (Jan 4-5, 1965, Studio 1, Abbey Road)
The Hymn of Jesus: Huddersfield Choral Society, Liverpool Philharmonic, HMV, 1945
The Perfect Fool – Ballet Music: RPO, HMV, 1962
The Planets
 Chorus, LSO, Decca, 1954
 BBC Women's Chorus, BBCSO, HMV, 1958
Humperdinck
Hansel and Gretel Overture: BBCSO, HMV, 1954
Ireland
A London Overture: Liverpool Philharmonic, Columbia, 1945
Liszt
Hungarian Rhapsody No 3: Symphony Orchestra, HMV, 1932
Piano Concerto No 1: Earl Wild, RPO, Reader's Digest, 1962
Litolff
Concerto Symphonique, No 4 – Scherzo: Shura Cherkassky, BBCSO, HMV, 1959
Massenet
Hérodiade – Les Phéniciennes (ballet music No 4): New Symphony Orchestra, HMV, 1932

Mendelssohn 
Elijah
 Isobel Baillie, James Johnston, Gladys Ripley, Harold Williams, Huddersfield Choral Society, Liverpool Philharmonic, Columbia, 1947
 Elsie Morison, Marjorie Thomas, Richard Lewis, John Cameron, Huddersfield Choral Society, Royal Liverpool Philharmonic, Columbia, 1957
 – As God the Lord of Israel liveth; Help, Lord!; Ye people, rend your hearts; If with all your hearts; Call first upon your God; Baal, we cry to thee; Take all the prophets of Baal; Is not His word like a fire; Hear ye, Israel; Be not afraid; Tarry here, my servant; It is enough; See how he sleepeth; Lift thine eyes; Arise, Elijah!; O rest in the Lord; Arise now!; Behold! God the Lord passed by!; Then shall the righteous shine forth; And then, shall your light break forth: Elizabeth Harwood, Marjorie Thomas, Richard Lewis, John Shirley-Quirk, Royal Choral Society, RPO, HMV, 1965
 – Choruses – Help, Lord; Yet doth the Lord see it not; Blessed are the men who fear him; Baal, we cry to thee; Thanks be to God; Be not afraid; Behold! God the Lord passeth by; And then shall your light break forth: Keith Falkner, Royal Choral Society, New Symphony Orchestra HMV, 1929
The Hebrides Overture: RPO, HMV, 1961
A Midsummer Night's Dream music (complete): Pauline Brockless, Patricia Howard, BBCSO and Chorus, HMV (as part of a recording of the play), 1955
Ruy Blas Overture: Orchestra, 1931, HMV
Symphony No 3: Liverpool Philharmonic, Columbia, 1948
Violin Concerto: Gioconda de Vito, LSO, HMV, 1953
Miaskovsky
Cello Concerto: Mstislav Rostropovich, Philharmonia, HMV, 1957

Mozart
Clarinet Concerto: Reginald Kell, LPO, HMV; 1940
Don Giovanni – Il mio tesoro; Dalla sua pace: Webster Booth, Liverpool Philharmonic, HMV, 1943
Idomeneo – Zeffiretti lusinghieri (sung in German); Se il padre perdei: Ria Ginster, Orchestra, 1933
Piano Concerto No 19: Artur Schnabel, LSO, HMV, 1937
Piano Concerto No 21: Artur Schnabel, LSO, HMV (rec 1937) 1959
Piano Concerto No 27: Artur Schnabel, LSO, HMV (rec 1937) 1959
Symphony No 40: Orchestra of the Royal Opera House, Covent Garden, HMV, 1928
The Marriage of Figaro – Non so più: Ria Ginster, Orch, 1933
Violin Concerto in A, K219: Jascha Heifetz, LSO, HMV, 1954
Violin Concerto in D, K 218
 Fritz Kreisler, Orchestra, HMV, 1932
 Yehudi Menuhin, Liverpool Philharmonic, HMV, 1943
Violin Concerto in E flat Major, K268
 Jacques Thibaud, Orchestra, HMV, 1938
 Jascha Heifetz, LSO, 1954
Mussorgsky
Night on the Bare Mountain: LSO, Vox (orig release date not known; reissued by Saga, 1972)
Pictures from an Exhibition: LSO, Vox (orig release date not known; reissued by Saga, 1972)
Parry
Jerusalem: Royal Choral Society, Philharmonia, HMV, 1953
Pepusch, arr. Austin
The Beggar's Opera: Elsie Morison, Zena Walker, John Cameron, John Neville, Monica Sinclair, Rachel Roberts, Ian Wallace, Eric Porter, Owen Brannigan, Paul Rogers, Constance Shacklock, Daphne Heard, Alexander Young, Robert Hardy, Pro Arte Chorus and Orchestra, HMV, 1955
Prokofiev
Lieutenant Kijé Suite: LSO, WRC, 1962
Peter and the Wolf: Ralph Richardson, LSO, Decca (rec 1959), 1970
Sinfonia Concertante: Mstislav Rostropovich, RPO, HMV, 1959
Symphony No. 1: LSO, Decca (rec 1959), 1970
Symphony No. 5: LSO, World Record Club, 1962
Puccini
Turandot – orchestral suite: Royal Opera Orchestra, 1927
Purcell
Suite from the Dramatic Music of Purcell (arr and ed Albert Coates): LSO, Decca, 1953
Quilter
Children's Overture: New Light Symphony Orchestra, HMV, 1929
Rachmaninov
Piano Concerto No 1: Benno Moiseiwitsch, Philharmonia, HMV, 1949
Piano Concerto No 2
 Cyril Smith, Liverpool Philharmonic, Columbia, 1947
 Moura Lympany, RPO, HMV, 1962
Prelude in C sharp minor: LSO, HMV, 1931
Rhapsody on a Theme of Paganini
 Cyril Smith, Liverpool Philharmonic, Columbia, 1950
 Cyril Smith, Philharmonia, Columbia, 1954
Symphony No 3: BBCSO, HMV, 1954
Rawsthorne 
Piano Concerto No 2
 Clifford Curzon, LSO, Decca, 1952
 Denis Matthews, BBCSO, HMV, 1958
Respighi
Ancient Dances and Airs, Second Suite: Orchestra of the Royal Opera House, Covent Garden, HMV, 1932
Fountains and Pines of Rome: LSO, Everest, 1960
 Romberg
Toy Symphony: New Symphony Orchestra, HMV, 1929

Rossini
The Barber of Seville, Overture: VPO, HMV, 1961
La Boutique fantasque (arr Respighi): RPO, HMV, 1962
The Journey to Rheims, Overture: VPO, HMV, 1961
Semiramide, Overture: VPO, HMV, 1961
The Silken Ladder Overture: RPO, HMV, 1961
William Tell – Pas de trois et Choeur tyrolienne: Orchestra of the Royal Opera House, Covent Garden, HMV, 1963
William Tell Overture
 Orchestra of the Royal Opera House, Covent Garden, HMV, 1927
 VPO, HMV, 1961
Rubbra
Piano Concerto: Denis Matthews, BBCSO, HMV, 1958
Saint-Saëns
Cello Concerto No 1: Mstislav Rostropovich, Philharmonia, HMV, 1957
Omphale's Spinning Wheel: Liverpool Philharmonic, Columbia, 1945
Violin Concerto No 3: Jascha Heifetz, New Symphony Orchestra, RCA, 1962
Schubert
Marche Militaire in D major: Liverpool Philharmonic Columbia, 1948
Overture in the Italian Style in C major: Liverpool Philharmonic, Columbia, 1945
Rosamunde – Entr'acte in B flat major: Liverpool Philharmonic, Columbia, 1948
Rosamunde – Overture; Entr'acte No 3 in B flat major; Ballet No 2 in G major: RPO, HMV, 1961
Symphony No 8: RPO, HMV, 1961
Symphony No 9: LSO, Decca, 1950
Schumann 
Cello Concerto: Pierre Fournier, Philharmonia, Columbia, 1957
Shostakovich
Symphony No 9: LSO, WRC, 1962

Sibelius 
En saga: Vienna Philharmonic Orchestra, HMV, 1963
Finlandia
 Symphony Orchestra, HMV, 1930
 Vienna Philharmonic Orchestra, HMV, 1963
Karelia Suite: Vienna Philharmonic Orchestra, HMV, 1963
Pohjola's Daughter: BBCSO, HMV, 1959
The Swan of Tuonela: Vienna Philharmonic Orchestra, HMV, 1963
Symphony No 1: BBCSO, HMV, 1958
Symphony No 2: BBCSO, HMV, 1958
Symphony No 4: BBCSO, BBC, (live recording, 1965), 2008
Symphony No 5: BBCSO, HMV, 1959
Smetana
Má vlast: RPO, HMV, 1965
The Bartered Bride Overture: RPO, HMV, 1961
 Stanford
Songs of the Sea: Peter Dawson, Men's Chorus and Orchestra, HMV, 1928
Eduard Strauss
Bahn Frei: Liverpool Philharmonic, Columbia, 1945
Johann Strauss I
Radetzky March: Liverpool Philharmonic, Columbia, 1945
Johann Strauss II
Annen Polka: Liverpool Philharmonic, Columbia, 1945
An Artist's Life: RPO, HMV, 1962
The Blue Danube: RPO, HMV, 1962
Emperor Waltz: RPO, HMV, 1962
Tales from the Vienna Woods: RPO, HMV, 1962
Wine, women and song: RPO, HMV, 1962

Sullivan 
Overture di Ballo: BBCSO, HMV, 1959
The Gondoliers
 (abridged): George Baker, Webster Booth, Sydney Granville, Derek Oldham, Leslie Rands, Leonard Hubbard, Stuart Robertson, Essie Ackland, Nellie Walker, Alice Moxon, Muriel Dickson, Beatrice Elburn, Phyllis Evens, chorus and orchestra, HMV, 1931 
 Geraint Evans, Alexander Young, Owen Brannigan, Richard Lewis, John Cameron, James Milligan, Monica Sinclair, Edna Graham, Elsie Morison, Marjorie Thomas, Stella Hitchens, Lavinia Renton, Helen Watts, Pro Arte Orchestra, Glyndebourne Festival Chorus, HMV, 1957
HMS Pinafore
 Henry Lytton, George Baker, Charles Goulding, Darrell Fancourt, Sydney Granville, Stuart Robertson, Elsie Griffin, Bertha Lewis, Nellie Briercliffe, chorus and orchestra, HMV, 1930
 George Baker, John Cameron, Richard Lewis, Owen Brannigan, James Milligan, Elsie Morison, Monica Sinclair, Marjorie Thomas, Glyndebourne Festival Chorus, Pro Arte Orchestra
Iolanthe
 George Baker, Darrell Fancourt, Derek Oldham, Sydney Granville, Leslie Rands, Bertha Lewis, Nellie Briercliffe, Alice Moxon, Nellie Walker, Winifred Lawson, Chorus and Light Opera Orchestra, chorus and orchestra, HMV, 1930
 George Baker, Ian Wallace, Alexander Young, Owen Brannigan, John Cameron, Monica Sinclair, Marjorie Thomas, April Cantelo, Heather Harper, Elsie Morison, Pro Arte Orchestra, Glyndebourne Festival Chorus, HMV, 1959
The Mikado: Owen Brannigan, Richard Lewis, Geraint Evans, Ian Wallace, John Cameron, Elsie Morison, Marjorie Thomas, Jeannette Sinclair, Monica Sinclair, Pro Arte Orchestra, Glyndebourne Festival Chorus, HMV, 1957
Patience
 Darrell Fancourt, Martyn Green, Derek Oldham, George Baker, Leslie Rands, Nellie Briercliffe, Marjorie Eyre, Rita Mackay, Bertha Lewis, Winifred Lawson, chorus and orchestra, HMV, 1931
 John Shaw, Trevor Anthony, Alexander Young, George Baker, John Cameron, Marjorie Thomas, Elizabeth Harwood, Heather Harper, Monica Sinclair, Elsie Morison, Glyndebourne Festival Chorus, Pro Arte Orchestra, HMV, 1962
 – Overture: Liverpool Philharmonic, Columbia, 1947
The Pirates of Penzance
 George Baker, Peter Dawson, Stuart Robertson, Derek Oldham, Leo Sheffield, Elsie Griffin, Nellie Briercliffe, Nellie Walker, Dorothy Gill, chorus and orchestra, HMV, 1929
 (abridged): George Baker, Darrell Fancourt, Stuart Robertson, Derek Oldham, Sydney Granville, Muriel Dickson, Bertha Lewis, chorus and orchestra, HMV, 1931
 George Baker, James Milligan, John Cameron, Richard Lewis, Owen Brannigan, Elsie Morison, Heather Harper, Marjorie Thomas, Monica Sinclair, Glyndebourne Festival Chorus, Pro Arte Orchestra, HMV
Princess Ida
 Richard Watson, Derek Oldham, Charles Goulding, George Baker, Henry Lytton, Darrell Fancourt, Stuart Robertson, Edward Halland, Muriel Dickson, Dorothy Gill, Alice Moxon, Nellie Briercliffe, Phyllis Evens, chorus and orchestra, HMV, 1932 
 Kenneth Sandford, Philip Potter, David Palmer, Jeffrey Skitch, John Reed, Donald Adams, Anthony Raffell, George Cook, Elizabeth Harwood, Christene Palmer, Ann Hood, Valerie Masterson, D'Oyly Carte Opera Chorus, RPO, Decca, 1965
 – Orchestral Selection: New Light Symphony Orchestra, HMV, 1931
Ruddigore
 George Baker, Derek Oldham, Sydney Granville, Stuart Robertson, Muriel Dickson, Nellie Briercliffe, Dorothy Gill, Alice Moxon, Darrell Fancourt, chorus and orchestra, HMV, 1931
 George Baker, Richard Lewis, Owen Brannigan, Harold Blackburn, Elsie Morison, Pamela Bowden, Monica Sinclair, Elizabeth Harwood, Joseph Rouleau, Pro Arte Orchestra, Glyndebourne Festival Chorus, HMV, 1963 
Trial by Jury: George Baker, Elsie Morison, Richard Lewis, John Cameron, Owen Brannigan, Bernard Turgeon, Pro Arte Orchestra, Glyndebourne Festival Chorus, HMV, 1961
The Yeomen of the Guard
 Arthur Hosking, Derek Oldham, Peter Dawson, Walter Glynne, George Baker, Leo Sheffield, L Gowings, Henry Millidge, Winifred Lawson, Nellie Briercliffe, Dorothy Gill, Elsie Griffin, chorus and orchestra, HMV, 1929 
 (abridged) George Baker, Sydney Granville, Derek Oldham, Muriel Dickson, Beatrice Elburn, Nellie Walker, chorus and orchestra, HMV, 1931
 Denis Dowling, Richard Lewis, John Cameron, Alexander Young, Geraint Evans, Owen Brannigan, John Carol Case, Elsie Morison, Marjorie Thomas, Monica Sinclair, Doreen Hume, Pro Arte Orchestra, Glyndebourne Festival Chorus, HMV, 1958 
 Anthony Raffell, Philip Potter, Donald Adams, David Palmer, John Reed, Kenneth Sandford, David Palmer, Thomas Lawlor, Elizabeth Harwood, Ann Hood, Gillian Knight, Margaret Eales, D'Oyly Carte Opera Chorus, RPO, Decca, 1964
 – Overture: Liverpool Philharmonic, Columbia, 1947
Suppé
Poet and Peasant Overture: National Symphony Orchestra, Decca, 1948

Tchaikovsky
1812 Overture: RPO, HMV, 1960
Eugene Onegin
 – Tatiana's Letter Scene: Joan Hammond, BBCSO, HMV, 1959
 – Polonaise and Waltz: Hallé, Columbia, 1942
Marche Slave
 Philharmonia, Columbia, 1949
 BBCSO, HMV, 1953
 RPO, HMV, 1960
Mazeppa – Cossack Dance: Liverpool Philharmonic, HMV, 1943
Romeo and Juliet Overture: RPO, HMV, 1960
Suite No 3 – Theme and Variations
 Liverpool Philharmonic, HMV, 1943
 Philharmonia, HMV, 1956
String Quartet No 1: Andante Cantabile (arr Schmid): BBCSO, HMV, 1959
Symphony No 5: BBCSO, HMV, 1955
The Sleeping Beauty – Waltz, Act 1: RPO, HMV, 1960
Variations on a Rococo Theme: Pierre Fournier, Philharmonia, Columbia, 1957
Violin Concerto
 Ruggiero Ricci, New Symphony Orchestra, Decca, 1950
 Ruggiero Ricci, LSO, Decca, 1961
Thomas 
Esmeralda – Vision Entrancing: Webster Booth, Liverpool Philharmonic, HMV, 1945
Vaughan Williams
Fantasia on a Theme by Thomas Tallis
 BBCSO, HMV, 1953
 Philharmonia, HMV, 1960
Fantasia on Greensleeves
 Hallé, Columbia, 1942
 LSO, HMV, 1957
Hugh the Drover: Mary Lewis, Constance Willis, Nellie Walker, Tudor Davies, Frederick Collier, Peter Dawson, William Anderson, chorus and orchestra, HMV, 1924
The Lark Ascending: Isolde Menges, Orchestra, HMV, 1930
Romance for Harmonica, String Orchestra and Piano: Larry Adler, String Orchestra, Columbia, 1952
Serenade to Music: Elsie Morison, Marjorie Thomas, Duncan Robertson, Trevor Anthony, chorus, LSO, HMV, 1957
Symphony No 4: BBCSO, BBC, (live recording, 1963) 2008
The Wasps Overture
 Hallé, Columbia, 1942
 LSO, HMV, 1957
Toward the Unknown Region: chorus, LSO, HMV, 1957
Verdi
Aida – Celeste Aida (in English): Webster Booth, Liverpool Philharmonic, HMV, 1945
Vieuxtemps
Violin Concerto No 5: Jascha Heifetz, LSO, HMV, 1948
Wagner
Das Rheingold Prelude: Philharmonia, Columbia, 1949
Die Walküre – Ride of the Valkyries: Philharmonia, Columbia, 1949
The Mastersingers – Chorale Act I and Finale Act III (live recordings): Royal Choral Society, Orchestra, HMV, 1929
The Mastersingers Overture: RPO, HMV, 1961
Walton
Belshazzar's Feast: James Milligan, Huddersfield Choral Society, Royal Liverpool Philharmonic, HMV, 1958
Viola Concerto: William Primrose, RPO, Philips, 1955
Coronation March, Orb and Sceptre: LSO, Decca, 1953
Façade – Scotch Rhapsody; Swiss Jodelling Song; Polka; Old Sir Faulk; Valse; Popular Song; Tango-Pasodoble; Tarantella: RPO, 1962
Symphony No 1: New Philharmonia, HMV, 1967
Warlock
Capriol Suite: RPO, HMV, 1966
Weber
Bassoon Concerto: Gwydion Brooke, Liverpool Philharmonic, Columbia, 1950

Notes

References
Gramophone online archive.

Shepherd, Marc. A Gilbert and Sullivan Discography
Sir Malcolm Sargent: a tribute. (1967). London: Daily Mirror Newspapers.

Discographies of classical conductors